Bloxwich United may refer to one of two English association football clubs:

Bloxwich United F.C., which existed between 2001 and 2002
Bloxwich United A.F.C., which adopted the name in 2008